Scar Ridge, also known as Scar Ridge (West Peak), is a mountain located in Grafton County, New Hampshire. It is part of the White Mountains. It is officially trailless and several different routes are possible. Scar Ridge is flanked to the west by Loon Mountain, to the northwest by Black Mountain, and to the east by Mount Osceola.

Scar Ridge stands within the watershed of the Pemigewasset River, which drains into the Merrimack River, and into the Gulf of Maine at Newburyport, Massachusetts. The northeast side of Scar Ridge drains into the Hancock Branch, a tributary of the East Branch of the Pemigewasset River. The southwest side of Scar Ridge drains into Telford Brook, Mack Brook, and Little East Pond Brook, all of which drain into Eastman Brook, and thence into the Pemigewasset.

See also 

 List of mountains in New Hampshire
 White Mountain National Forest
 New England Hundred Highest

References 

Mountains of New Hampshire
Mountains of Grafton County, New Hampshire
New England Hundred Highest